The 2022–23 season is the 138th season in the existence of Millwall Football Club, 96th consecutive season in the Football League, and 46th in the second tier. This is the club's sixth consecutive season in the Championship, their longest streak. In addition to the league, they will also compete in the FA Cup and the EFL Cup. The attendance of 18,524 against Sunderland at The Den is the highest since an FA Cup game against Chelsea in 1995. That record was topped a month later against Norwich City, with 18,785 supporters at the Den.

First-team squad

Statistics

Players with names in italics and marked * were on loan from another club for the whole of their season with Millwall.

|-
!colspan=14|Players who left the club:

|}

Goals record

Disciplinary record

Transfers

In

Out

Loans in

Loans out

Pre-season and friendlies
On June 8, Millwall announced their first two pre-season friendlies, against Dartford and Ipswich Town along with a training camp in Republic of Ireland. Two days later, a trip to Colchester United was confirmed. A behind-closed-doors meeting with Crystal Palace was also planned. A fifth friendly match was confirmed in July, against Watford. On 13 July, the club announced they would host Hammarby at The Den in a pre-season meeting.

A mid-season friendly during the 2022 FIFA World Cup winter break against Brøndby was announced.

Competitions

Overall record

Championship

League table

Results summary

Results by round

Matches

On 23 June, the league fixtures were announced.

FA Cup

Millwall were drawn at home to Sheffield United in the third round.

EFL Cup

Millwall were drawn away to Cambridge United in the first round.

References

External links

Millwall F.C. seasons
Millwall F.C.
Millwall
Millwall
English football clubs 2022–23 season